Ekspress-AM22 (meaning Express-AM22) is a Russian communications satellite. It belongs to the Russian Satellite Communications Company (RSCC) based in Moscow, Russia.

Eutelsat SESAT-2 
The satellite has a total of 24 transponders, 12 of which are referred to as SESAT-2, and are leased to Eutelsat by the Russian Satellite Communications Company (RSCC). The remaining 12 transponders, with domestic coverage of the Russian Federation, are commercialised by the RSCC under the name Ekspress-AM22.

Launch 
Ekspress-AM22 was launched by Khrunichev State Research and Production Space Center, using a Proton-K / DM-02 launch vehicle. The launch took place at 23:00:00 UTC on 28 December 2003, from Site 200/39 at Baikonur Cosmodrome, Kazakhstan. Successfully deployed into geostationary transfer orbit (GTO), Ekspress-AM22 raised itself into an operational geostationary orbit using its apogee motor.

Mission 
The satellite can be received in Europe, Asia, the Middle East and the most part of Russia. The transfer takes place in the Ku-band. Since the launch of Ekspress-AM6, Ekspress-AM22 has been moved to a new orbit at 80.0° East.

References 

Ekspress satellites
Spacecraft launched in 2003
2003 in Russia
Satellites using the KAUR bus
Eutelsat satellites
Communications satellites in geostationary orbit
Spacecraft launched by Proton rockets